Vatika High School for Deaf & Dumb is a special school for deaf and dumb children in Sector 19-B of Chandigarh. Neelam Dutta is the current principal of the school. Affiliated by the Punjab School Education Board, Mohali, the school runs classes from 1st to 10th.

Besides education the school provides training vocational in the field of home science, physical education, drawing & painting, computer, beauty parlor, cutting & tailoring, photostat, making of greeting cards, block-printing, etc.

See also 
Education in India

References

External links

Schools for the deaf in India
Schools in Chandigarh
1991 establishments in Chandigarh
Educational institutions established in 1991